Phaeocrella is a monotypic genus of fungi in the family Calosphaeriaceae. It contains the sole species Phaeocrella acerosa.

References

External links 

Monotypic Sordariomycetes genera
Calosphaeriales